formerly Famicom Tsūshin, is a line of Japanese video game magazines published by Kadokawa Game Linkage (previously known as Gzbrain), a subsidiary of Kadokawa. Famitsu is published in both weekly and monthly formats as well as in the form of special topical issues devoted to only one console, video game company, or other theme.  the original Famitsu publication, is considered the most widely read and respected video game news magazine in Japan. From October 28, 2011, the company began releasing the digital version of the magazine exclusively on BookWalker weekly.

The name Famitsu is a portmanteau abbreviation of  the word "Famicom" itself comes from a portmanteau abbreviation of "Family Computer" (the Japanese name for the Nintendo Entertainment System)—the dominant video game console in Japan during the 1980s.

History
, a computer game magazine, started in 1982 as an extra issue of ASCII, and later it became a periodic magazine.  was a column in Login, focused on the Famicom platform, and ran from March 1985 to December 1986 issue. It received a good reception, so the publisher decided to found the magazine specialized for it.

The first issue of Famitsu was published on June 6, 1986, as Famicom Tsūshin. It sold less than 200,000 copies, despite 700,000 copies printed. The major competitor was Family Computer Magazine launched in July 1985 by Tokuma Shoten. Famitsus editor found many readers had multiple game consoles, and they thought it would be better if the magazine covered various platforms. Increasing contents and the page count gradually, the magazine was published three times per month instead of semimonthly publication. Alongside the weekly magazine, a monthly version called  was also published.

Hirokazu Hamamura, an editor-in-chief (1992-2002), felt the beginning of a new era when he saw a private demonstration of Final Fantasy VII in 1993. He thought the name Famicom Tsūshin should be refurbished.

The magazine was published by ASCII from its founding through March 2000 when it was sold to Enterbrain, which published it for 13 years until their parent company Kadokawa published it from 2013 to 2017. Since 2017, Kadokawa's subsidiary Gzbrain has been publishing the magazine, while in 2019 the company changed its name to Kadokawa Game Linkage.

Shūkan Famitsū and Gekkan Famitsū
Famicom Tsūshin initially focused on the Famicom platform, but later it featured multi-platform coverage. Famicom Tsūshin was renamed to Famitsu in 1995. Shūkan Famitsū is a weekly publication concentrating on video game news and reviews, and is published every Thursday with a circulation of 500,000 per issue. Gekkan Famitsū is published monthly.

Necky the Fox
Famitsu magazine covers alternately feature pop idols or actresses on even-numbered issues and the Famitsu mascot,  the Fox in odd-numbered issues. Year-end and special editions all feature Necky dressed as popular contemporary video game characters. Necky is the cartoon creation of artist Susumu Matsushita, and he takes the form of a costumed fox. The costumes worn by Necky reflect current popular video games. Necky makes a cameo appearance in Super Mario Maker.

Special-topic Famitsu publications
Famitsu publishes other magazines dedicated to particular consoles. Currently in circulation are:

 (previously ) is written for an older audience and covers retrogaming. It has been published monthly since November 2010.
 reports on online gaming.
 reports on Nintendo platforms (currently the Nintendo 3DS and Nintendo Switch). The magazine was formerly known as Famitsū 64 and then Famitsū Cube (among other variations of those two names) based on whatever platforms Nintendo was producing games for at the time.
 reports on mobile gaming via GREE.
 reports on mobile gaming via Mobage.

Former special topics
Famitsu spin-offs that are no longer in circulation include:

 (previously Famicom Tsūshin Kōryaku Special) was written for younger audiences and concentrated on video game hints and strategy. It was published monthly and was discontinued in September 2002.
 (previously Famitsū Comic) was a comic and manga magazine published irregularly between 1992 and 1995.
 reported on Sega platforms news and covered the Dreamcast. Previous incarnations of this magazine included Sega Saturn Tsūshin which covered the Sega Saturn, with earlier issues covering earlier Sega platforms.
 covered bishōjo games.
 covered the Satellaview. It was published monthly and ran for only 12 issues from May 1995 to May 1996. Its inaugural issue was the May 1995 issue of Gekkan Famicom Tsūshin.
 covered the Virtual Boy. Only one issue was ever published in 1995.
 (previously PlayStation Tsūshin) began publication in May 1996, and reported on Sony platforms news. It was later known as Famitsū PS2 and Famitsū PSP+PS3 before being discontinued in March 2010.
 (previously GameWave DVD) covered events, film, and previews. Each magazine included a DVD disc (NTSC Region 2) that contained video game footage such as trailers and gameplay tips, as well interviews with developers and publishers. It was published monthly, first starting in September 2000 until its final issue of May 2011.
 reported on Xbox and Xbox 360 news. It was published monthly, first starting in January 2002 before being discontinued in 2013.

Scoring

Video games are graded in Famitsu via a "Cross Review" by having four critics each assign the game a score from 0 to 10, with 10 being the highest score. The scores of are then added together for a maximum possible score of 40. , twenty-seven games have received perfect scores from Famitsu. The console with the highest number of perfect-scoring games is the PlayStation 3, with seven total. Four of the perfect-scoring games on PlayStation 3 were also released on the Xbox 360, which is tied with the Wii for the second-highest number of perfect scores at five total. Franchises with multiple perfect score winners include The Legend of Zelda with four titles, Metal Gear with three titles, and Final Fantasy with two titles. The most recent game to receive a perfect score is Ghost of Tsushima.

, all but three games with perfect scores are from Japanese companies, nine being published/developed by Nintendo, four by Square Enix, three by Sega, three by Konami and one by Capcom. , the only three completely foreign games to achieve a perfect score are The Elder Scrolls V: Skyrim by Bethesda Softworks, Grand Theft Auto V by Rockstar Games, and Ghost of Tsushima, from Sucker Punch Productions. Other foreign games that have achieved near-perfect scores are L.A. Noire, Red Dead Redemption, Red Dead Redemption 2 and Grand Theft Auto IV – all four of which came from Rockstar Games; Call of Duty: Modern Warfare 2, Call of Duty: Black Ops, and Call of Duty: Modern Warfare 3 – all from Activision, although published by Square Enix in Japan; Gears of War 3 from Epic Games; and The Last of Us Part II and Uncharted 4: A Thief's End from Naughty Dog. (Kingdom Hearts II is a joint effort between Square Enix and Disney Interactive Studios.)

Awards

Famitsu administers the Famitsu awards. Video games receive a number of different awards in categories like Innovation, Biggest Hit, Rookie Award, Highest Quality, etc. One or two "Game of the Year" awards are granted as the top prize. Top prize winners are determined by a combination of critical and fan review scores as well as sales figures.

Relationship with other magazines
UK trade magazine MCV and Famitsu have an exclusive partnership which sees news and content from each magazine appear in the other.

See also
Enterbrain
Famitsu Bunko
Famitsu scores

Notes

References

External links
 
Famitsu scores archive (via The Internet Archive)

1986 establishments in Japan
Fictional foxes
Kadokawa Dwango franchises
Magazines established in 1986
Magazines published in Tokyo
Monthly magazines published in Japan
Video game magazines published in Japan
Weekly magazines published in Japan